Fruit in the Neighbour's Garden is a 1956 West German comedy film directed by Erich Engels and starring Oskar Sima, Grethe Weiser and Gundula Korte. It is a remake of the 1935 film of the same title.

The film's sets were designed by the art directors Hans Jürgen Kiebach and Gabriel Pellon.

Cast
 Oskar Sima as Versicherungsvertreter Sperling
 Grethe Weiser as Camilla - seine Frau
 Gundula Korte as Inge Sperling - beider Tochter
 Ursula Herking as Berta - 1.Dienstmädchen
 Helen Vita as Rita - 2.Dienstmädchen
 Albert Florath as Dr. Kieselbach - Arzt
 Gerty Godden as Anna Kieselbach - Seine Frau
 Peter Garden as Christian Kieselbach - beider Sohn
 Paul Henckels as Schriftsteller Wendland
 Wolfgang Völz as Klaus Wendland
 Peter Carsten as Briefträger
 Robert Fackler as Justizwachtmeister Pfeffer
Hannes Schiel as Versicherungsdirektor Usedom
 Carsta Löck as Hintertupferin
 Nora Minor as Milchfrau Wurzer

References

Bibliography 
 Hans-Michael Bock and Tim Bergfelder. The Concise Cinegraph: An Encyclopedia of German Cinema. Berghahn Books.

External links 
 

1956 films
1956 comedy films
German comedy films
West German films
1950s German-language films
Films directed by Erich Engels
Remakes of German films
Gloria Film films
1950s German films